Eel Brook Common is common land in the London Borough of Hammersmith and Fulham, close to Fulham Broadway, with its south-eastern boundary along New King's Road. According to the Fulham Society, the name actually is a derivative of 'hill brook common' - which relates to Musgrave Crescent, which is raised much higher than the surrounding land.  It is believed that this is artificial and it probably was originally a Bronze Age mound - either a raised piece of ground to defend against attackers, or as a burial mound.  When you leave Eel Brook Common from the north side, you go up a steep ramp - up onto Musgrave Crescent. It is within the Hammersmith and Fulham Conservation Area of Parsons Green.

History
In 1883 and again in 1891 a then amateur local football team, Fulham F.C., played their home games there. The Common usually hosts a circus in early summer - and has three other fairs there every year - including Carters Steam Fair.

During World War II, an underground bunker was located under Eel Brook Common; this was to protect residents from the Luftwaffe - especially during the Blitz period - and explains why Eel Brook Common is unusually flat.

Illustrator Ralph Steadman lived opposite the Common while in London during the mid-20th century, as marked by a nearby blue plaque.

During 2002/2003 Groundwork West London completed a £300,000 make-over of the Common, installing surfaced and fenced sports pitches and revamping the vegetation there.

In the year 2008/2009, Chelsea Football Club help create an astroturf pitch which can be used in the community. It was sponsored by Chelsea in association with a sports wear firm and is in the blue of Chelsea Football Club.  Many local residents complained to the Council about the colour in a green environment, and so there has been much work to grow varied natural screening.

The common can be accessed by many roads - including Effie Road to the north, Musgrave Crescent to the north-east and New King's Road to the south-east.

There are two tennis courts and a children's playground primarily aimed at under-6s.

References

External links
 Eel Brook Common  London Gardens Online

Parks and open spaces in the London Borough of Hammersmith and Fulham
History of the London Borough of Hammersmith and Fulham
Fulham F.C. home grounds
Fulham
Common land in London